Hoffenheim station is a railway station in the municipality of Hoffenheim, located in the Rhein-Neckar-Kreis in Baden-Württemberg, Germany.

Location

The station is located west of the city centre, directly south of the platforms the Elsenz Valley Railway crosses the Eschelbacher Straße with a level crossing secured with half barriers with full closure.

References

Railway stations in Baden-Württemberg
Buildings and structures in Rhein-Neckar-Kreis